Michael A. Kelen (born October 17, 1948) is a former Canadian judge. He served on the Federal Court of Canada from 2001 until his retirement in 2012.

References

1948 births
Living people
Judges of the Federal Court of Canada
People from Montreal